The 2008 China League One title was won by Jiangsu Sainty.

Promotion and Relegation
Teams promoted from Yi League 2007
 Shanghai East Asia
 Sichuan F.C.
 Anhui Jiufang

Teams promoted to Super League 2009
 Jiangsu Sainty
 Chongqing Lifan

Team relegated to Yi League 2009
 Yantai Yiteng

Final league table

Top scorers

External links
 News, results and table  on Sohu 

China League One seasons
2
China
China